"Jane" is a 1979 song by Jefferson Starship from the album Freedom at Point Zero. The song peaked on the Billboard Hot 100 at No. 14, and spent three weeks at No. 6 on the Cash Box Top 100. In Canada, the song peaked at No. 13.  Billboard Magazine described "Jane" as "a fiery track paced by stinging guitars and some burning rhythm work." Cash Box described it as "an explosive rocker, with slashing guitars."  Record World called it a "driving rocker" and praised Mickey Thomas' vocals. 

It is one of the few songs that was performed live by both the David Freiberg-led Jefferson Starship and the Mickey Thomas-led Starship.

Chart history

Weekly charts

Year-end charts

In popular culture
 GQ in 2015 said it was a "perfect, complex, trash-gem of work of art."
 It was used as the opening music to the 2001 film Wet Hot American Summer and all the opening sequences in Netflix prequel series Wet Hot American Summer: First Day of Camp. It is also used in the sequel series Wet Hot American Summer: Ten Years Later.
 It was featured in the 2009 video game Grand Theft Auto IV: The Lost and Damned until April 2018 when Rockstar Games lost the Licensing to the song. In October 2015, the song was released for Rock Band 4.
 It is used by professional wrestler Orange Cassidy as his ring entrance music when he is on the independent circuit and, as of June 29, 2022, in All Elite Wrestling.
 It was featured in the opening sequences of 2023 film Cocaine Bear.

References

Jefferson Starship songs
1979 songs
1979 singles
Film theme songs
Comedy television theme songs